The Belgium national cricket team is the team that represents Belgium in international cricket. The team is organised by the Belgian Cricket Federation, which has been an associate member of the International Cricket Council (ICC) since 2005 (and previously an affiliate member, from 1991). Belgium played its first international match in 1910, in an exhibition tournament in Brussels that also featured France, the Netherlands, and the Marylebone Cricket Club (MCC). Since the 1990s, the team has regularly competed in European Cricket Council (ECC) tournaments, usually in the lower divisions.

History

Beginnings

The first game of modern cricket in Belgium appears to have been a match played by British soldiers before the Battle of Waterloo in 1815, though research has suggested that cricket may be related to a game exported from Flanders to England in the Sixteenth Century. The first record of organised cricket is a painting dated 1870 that hangs in the pavilion of Lord's Cricket Ground in London that depicts the opening of the Brussels cricket ground in 1866 by mayor Jules Anspach.

The national team first played a match in 1905 when they played against the Netherlands. The match was played almost every year until 1986. Belgium hosted a tournament as part of the 1910 Brussels Exhibition also involving France, the MCC and the Netherlands. Belgium lost their match against the MCC by an innings and lost to the Netherlands by 116 runs.

ICC membership

Belgium became an affiliate member of the ICC in 1991. They began to play in European tournaments, playing in the ECC Trophy for the first time in 1999 when they finished last. They fared better in the next tournament, reaching the semi finals of the 2001 ECC Trophy in Austria.

They finished sixth in the ECC Trophy in 2003, and gained associate membership of the ICC two years later. Belgium finished fourth in the European Affiliates Championship in 2005 and both played and hosted Division Three of the newly restructured European Championship in August 2007, they finished fifth.

In 2009 Belgium played in La Manga Club Ground, again in Division 3. Richard Nash captained the team and finished fourth. In 2011 Belgium hosted the new 2011 ICC European T20 Championship Division Two where they won the championship undefeated. The captain for the T20 squad was André Wagener.
Belgium got promoted to Division 1 where they finished a credible 7th out of 12 teams having fielded a weakened team because of visa issues. Their performance qualified them for the WCL 8 qualifier the following year.

In 2012 Belgium played the World Cricket League 8 Qualifier in La Manga Club Ground where they beat Gibraltar, Austria and France to qualify for the World Cricket league for the first time. Captained by Sheriyar Butt and Simon Newport in this tournament, they will travel to Samoa in September. On July 31, the Under-19 Belgium Cricket Team (Aadit Sheth, Aaryan Mehta, Raj Sanghvi, Sabhya Jain, Burhan Niaz, Shaan Shah, Dev Jogani, Aarjav Jain, Alex Uzupris, Theodore Develodore, Aamad Ali Rehman, Rehaan Shah, and Zeeshan Diwan Ali), travelled to Essex to participate in the U19 Cricket World Cup Qualifier Europe Division 2.

2018-Present
In April 2018, the ICC decided to grant full Twenty20 International (T20I) status to all its members. Therefore, all Twenty20 matches played between Belgium and other ICC members after 1 January 2019 will be a full T20I. Belgium played their first Twenty20 International on 11 May 2019 against Germany.

In August 2020, Belgium won the 2020 Luxembourg T20I Trophy tournament, after winning all four matches they played in.

Current squad
Year: 2020-21
 Sheraz Sheikh (Sunny) (c)
 Nemish Mehta (vc)
 Ali Raza (wk)
 Mamoon Latif
 Wahidullah Usmani
 Murid Ekrami
 Zakil Saber
 Gurnam Singh
 Ashiqullah Said
 Sazzad Hosen
 Muhammad Muneeb
 Raja Saqlain Tasawar
 Khalid Ahmadi
 Sherul Mehta (wk)
 Anthony Ney (wk)
 Phil Ney

Grounds

Tournament history

European Affiliates Championship

One-Day
1999: 7th place
2001: Semi-finals
2003: 6th place
2005: 4th place
2007: 5th place (remaining in division 3)
2009: 4th place (remaining il division 3)
2012: 1st place World Cricket League 8 qualifier. Tournament in September in Samoa.
T20
2011: 1st Place Division 2 T20 World Cup Qualifier.
2011: 7th place Division 1 T20 World Cup Qualifier.

Records and statistics 

International Match Summary — Belgium
 
Last updated 4 July 2022

Twenty20 International 
 Belgium's highest score: 233/6 v Malta, 11 June 2022 at Ghent Oval, Meersen, Ghent.
 Highest individual score: 125*, Shaheryar Butt v Czech Republic, 29 August 2020 at Pierre Werner Cricket Ground, Walferdange.
 Best bowling figures in an innings: 4/8, Burman Niaz v Malta, 8 July 2021 at Marsa Sports Club, Marsa.

Most T20I runs for Belgium 

Most T20I wickets for Belgium 

T20I record versus other nations

Records complete to T20I #1610. Last updated 4 July 2022.

See also
 List of Belgium Twenty20 International cricketers

References

Cricket in Belgium
National cricket teams
Cricket
Belgium in international cricket